A Tribute to Brother Weldon is a tribute album to jazz musician Weldon Irvine by hip hop producer Madlib's Jazz project under the alias of Monk Hughes. The album features music by Weldon Irvine and was released in 2004 following his death in 2002. It was released on Stones Throw Records in CD format. The track "Time" was previewed by Madlib at Red Bull Music Academy 2002 in São Paulo, Brazil.

Track list

All tracks produced, arranged and composed by Madlib.

 "Prelude/Run With The Sun (Afterlife)" - 9:01
 "A Piece For Brother Weldon" - 5:10
 "Irvine's Vine (Spirit Man's Lament)" - 4:10
 "Time" - 5:51
 "Welldone" - 3:44
 "Liberated" - 4:08
 "Keys" - 6:02
 "Still Young, Gifted & Broke" - 4:32
 "Nodlew's Sea" - 4:43
 "Day Of Spirit Man" - 5:12
 "Master Wel's Tune" - 3:57
 "The Beginning, The Middle & The End" - 17:02

Credits
 Bass, Electric, Space Piano - Monk Hughes
 Drums, Loops, Kalimba - Otis Jackson Jr.
 Electric Piano (Fender Rhodes), Arp, Piano - Joe McDuphrey
 Organ, Moog, Percussion - Morgan Adams III
 Exec. Producer - Peanut Butter Wolf

References

Madlib albums
2004 albums
Stones Throw Records albums
Tribute albums